Astycrateia, also Astycratea, Astycratia or Astykrateia (Ancient Greek: Ἀστυκράτεια), in Greek mythology, may refer to:

Astycrateia, daughter of Polyeidos and possibly Eurydameia, daughter of Phyleus. She was the sister of Manto, Coeranus and probably, Euchenor and Cleitus.
Astycrateia, one of the Niobids.
Astycrateia, daughter of Aeolus and Telepora or Telepatra, daughter of Laestrygon. She was the sister of Androcles, Chrysippus, Iocastus, Phalacrus, Pheraemon, Xuthus, and the daughters' as Aeole, Dia, Hephaestia, Iphthe and Periboea.

Notes

References 

 Apollodorus, The Library with an English Translation by Sir James George Frazer, F.B.A., F.R.S. in 2 Volumes, Cambridge, MA, Harvard University Press; London, William Heinemann Ltd. 1921. ISBN 0-674-99135-4. Online version at the Perseus Digital Library. Greek text available from the same website.
Gaius Julius Hyginus, Fabulae from The Myths of Hyginus translated and edited by Mary Grant. University of Kansas Publications in Humanistic Studies. Online version at the Topos Text Project.
 Pausanias, Description of Greece with an English Translation by W.H.S. Jones, Litt.D., and H.A. Ormerod, M.A., in 4 Volumes. Cambridge, MA, Harvard University Press; London, William Heinemann Ltd. 1918. . Online version at the Perseus Digital Library
Pausanias, Graeciae Descriptio. 3 vols. Leipzig, Teubner. 1903.  Greek text available at the Perseus Digital Library.

Niobids
Princesses in Greek mythology